Red Cliffs Secondary College (RCSC) is a public co-educational high school in Red Cliffs, Victoria, Australia. It is the only Victorian state government run school in the Mildura District that offers a continuous education from year 7 through to year 12.

The initials of the school's motto "Resilient, Compassionate, Successful, Citizens" matches that of its name.

House system 
The school has a house system of four houses. Students are assigned to a house and those with siblings who also attend the school are placed in the same house. Students participate in a number of sports events throughout the year, including the Swimming Carnival, Cross Country and Athletics Day. Points are awarded to each house for how its students perform. The houses are:

 Allungah (yellow)
 Bindaree (blue)
 Terragong (green)
 Warragai (red)

Principals 
 AM Cracknell (1961−1963)
 GG Sloane (1964−1966) 
 J Fletcher (1967−1968)
 JA Mitchell (1969−1972)
 E Borschmann (1973−1980)
 E Warhurst (1981−1992)
 (D Currie acting Principal in 1993)
 G Roberts (1994−1995)
 (M Jackman acting Principal in 1996)
 J Cortese (1997−2008)
 DG Browne (2009−present)

Notable alumni 
 Myf Warhurst, TV and radio personality
 Simon Leach, Musician in Little Birdy
 Kit Warhurst, musician
 Jenny Bannister, fashion designer
 Arron Wood, environmental activist

References

External links 
 

Public high schools in Victoria (Australia)
Rock Eisteddfod Challenge participants